Brett Ryan Martin (born April 28, 1995) is an American professional baseball pitcher for the Texas Rangers of Major League Baseball (MLB). He made his MLB debut in 2019.

Amateur career
Martin attended Morristown-Hamblen High School East in Morristown, Tennessee. Undrafted out of high school, Martin initially attended the University of Tennessee, but suffered an injury and transferred before appearing in a game. He transferred to Walters State Community College and played college baseball in 2014 for them, producing a 9–2 record with a 3.83 earned run average (ERA) in 42 innings.

Professional career
He was drafted by the Texas Rangers in the fourth round, 126th overall, of the 2014 MLB draft and signed for a $475,000 signing bonus. He made his professional debut in 2014 with the Rookie-level AZL Rangers, going 1–4 with a 5.40 ERA in 15 games. In 2015, he played for the Hickory Crawdads of the Class A South Atlantic League, compiling a 5–6 record and 3.49 ERA in 20 games (18 starts). In 2016, he played for the AZL Rangers, Crawdads, and High Desert Mavericks of the Class A-Advanced California League, posting a combined 4–4 record with a 4.41 ERA in 17 starts between the three teams. He appeared in three games for the Surprise Saguaros of the Arizona Fall League in 2016. Martin spent 2017 with the Down East Wood Ducks of the Class A-Advanced Carolina League where he started 16 games and collected a 4–8 record and 4.70 ERA with 90 strikeouts in  innings.

The Rangers added Martin to their 40-man roster after the 2017 season. He spent the 2018 season with the Frisco RoughRiders of the Double-A Texas League with whom he struggled, posting a 2–10 record with a 7.28 ERA in 89 innings over 29 games (15 starts). In 2019, Martin was optioned to the Nashville Sounds of the Triple-A Pacific Coast League to open the season, as a reliever.

On April 19, 2019, he was called up to the major league roster for the first time. He made his debut that night, recording a scoreless inning in relief versus the Houston Astros. He finished the 2019 season with Texas, going 2–3 with a 4.76 ERA and 62 strikeouts over  innings. In 2020, Martin was 1–1 with a 1.84 ERA in  innings. Over  innings in 2021 for Texas, Martin posted a 4–4 record with a 3.18 ERA while striking out 42 batters.  In 2022, Martin posted a 1–7 record with a 4.14 ERA and 40 strikeouts over 50 innings.

On January 13, 2023, it was announced that Martin would undergo shoulder surgery and would miss most of the 2023 season.

Personal life
Martin has type 1 diabetes. On July 3, 2020, it was announced that Martin had tested positive for COVID-19.

References

External links

1995 births
Living people
People from Morristown, Tennessee
Baseball players from Tennessee
Major League Baseball pitchers
Texas Rangers players
Walters State Senators baseball players
Walters State Community College alumni
Arizona League Rangers players
Hickory Crawdads players
High Desert Mavericks players
Surprise Saguaros players
Down East Wood Ducks players
Frisco RoughRiders players
Nashville Sounds players
People with type 1 diabetes